City Boy may refer to:

City Boy (band), English rock band in the late 1970s
 City Boy (album), the debut album from City Boy
"City Boy" (song), a song by Norwegian band Donkeyboy
City Boy (film), a 1992 PBS/Wonderworks television film based on the novel Freckles
City Boy: The Adventures of Herbie Bookbinder, 1948 novel by Herman Wouk
Cityboy, a newspaper column by Geraint Anderson in The London Paper